Transtillaspis cosangana is a species of moth of the family Tortricidae. It is found in Napo Province, Ecuador.

The wingspan is about 17.5 mm. The ground colour of the forewings is creamish, partly suffused with pale ferruginous and olive grey and spotted and strigulated (finely streaked) with brown. The markings are olive brown. The hindwings are brownish, but paler basally.

Etymology
The species name refers to Cosanga, the type locality.

References

Moths described in 2009
Transtillaspis
Taxa named by Józef Razowski